Interferon alpha-n3 (Alferon-N) is a medication consisting of purified natural human interferon alpha proteins used for the treatment of genital warts.

References 

Immunostimulants
Antiviral drugs